Martha Bayona Pineda (born 12 August 1995) is a Colombian track cyclist. She represented her nation at the 2015 UCI Track Cycling World Championships, and also finished tenth in the women's keirin at the 2016 Summer Olympics.

Career results
2015
Pan American Track Championships
2nd Keirin
2nd Team Sprint (with Juliana Gaviria)
Copa Cuba de Pista
2nd Team Sprint (with Angie Sol Roa)
2nd 500m Time Trial
2016
Pan American Track Championships
2nd  500m Time Trial
2nd  Team Sprint (with Juliana Gaviria
3rd  Keirin
GP von Deutschland im Sprint
3rd Keirin
3rd Team Sprint (with Juliana Gaviria)
3rd Keirin, Cottbuser SprintCup
2017
2nd  Keirin, UCI World Track Championships

References

External links
profile at Cyclingarchives.com

1995 births
Colombian female cyclists
Living people
Olympic cyclists of Colombia
Cyclists at the 2016 Summer Olympics
People from Bucaramanga
Cyclists at the 2019 Pan American Games
Pan American Games medalists in cycling
Pan American Games gold medalists for Colombia
Pan American Games silver medalists for Colombia
Pan American Games bronze medalists for Colombia
Medalists at the 2019 Pan American Games
Sportspeople from Santander Department
20th-century Colombian women
21st-century Colombian women
Competitors at the 2018 Central American and Caribbean Games
Competitors at the 2018 South American Games
South American Games gold medalists for Colombia
South American Games medalists in cycling